Murgantia may refer to:
 a synonym for Morgantina, an archaeological site in east central Sicily, southern Italy
 Murgantia (bug), a shield bug genus in the tribe Pentatomini